The English modal verbs are a subset of the English auxiliary verbs used mostly to express modality (properties such as possibility, obligation, etc.). They can be distinguished from other verbs by their defectiveness (they do not have participle or infinitive forms) and by their neutralization (that they do not take the ending -(e)s in the third-person singular).

The principal English modal verbs are can, could, may, might, shall, should, will, would, and must. Certain other verbs are sometimes classed as modals; these include ought, had better, and (in certain uses) dare and need. Verbs which share only some of the characteristics of the principal modals are sometimes called "quasi-modals", "semi-modals", or "pseudo-modals".

Modal verbs and their features
The verbs customarily classed as modals in English have the following properties:
 They do not inflect (in the modern language) except insofar as some of them come in present–past (present–preterite) pairs. They do not add the ending -(e)s in the third-person singular (the present-tense modals therefore follow the preterite-present paradigm).
 They function as auxiliary verbs: they modify the modality of another verb, which they govern. This verb generally appears as a bare infinitive, although in some definitions, a modal verb can also govern the to-infinitive (as in the case of ought).
 They have the syntactic properties associated with auxiliary verbs in English, principally that they can undergo subject–auxiliary inversion (in questions, for example) and can be negated by the appending of not after the verb.

The following verbs have all of the above properties, and can be classed as the principal modal verbs of English. They are listed here in present–preterite pairs where applicable:
 can and could
 may and might
 shall and should
 will and would
 must (no preterite; see etymology below)

Note that the preterite forms are not necessarily used to refer to past time, and in some cases, they are near-synonyms to the present forms. Note that most of these so-called preterite forms are most often used in the subjunctive mood in the present tense. The auxiliary verbs may and let are also used often in the subjunctive mood. Famous examples of these are "May The Force be with you." and "Let God bless you with good." These are both sentences that express some uncertainty; hence they are subjunctive sentences.

The verbs listed below mostly share the above features but with certain differences. They are sometimes, but not always, categorized as modal verbs. They may also be called "semi-modals".

 The verb ought differs from the principal modals only in that it governs a to-infinitive rather than a bare infinitive (compare he should go with he ought to go). 
 The verbs dare and need can be used as modals, often in the negative (Dare he fight?; You dare not do that.; You need not go.), although they are more commonly found in constructions where they appear as ordinary inflected verbs (He dares to fight; You don't need to go). There is also a dialect verb, nearly obsolete but sometimes heard in Appalachia and the Deep South of the United States: darest, which means "dare not", as in "You darest do that."
 The verb had in the expression had better behaves like a modal verb, hence had better (considered as a compound verb) is sometimes classed as a modal or semi-modal.
 The verb used in the expression used to (do something) can behave as a modal, but is more often used with do-support than with auxiliary-verb syntax: Did she used to do it? (or Did she use to do it?) and She didn't used to do it (or She didn't use to do it) are more common than Used she to do it? and She used not (usedn't) to do it.

Other English auxiliaries appear in a variety of different forms and are not regarded as modal verbs. These are:
 be, used as an auxiliary in passive voice and continuous aspect constructions; it follows auxiliary-verb syntax even when used as a copula, and in auxiliary-like formations such as be going to, is to and be about to;
 do; see do-support.

For more general information about English verb inflection and auxiliary usage, see English verbs and English clause syntax.

Etymology
The modals can and could are from Old English can(n) and cuþ, which were respectively present and preterite forms of the verb cunnan ("to be able"). The silent l in the spelling of could results from analogy with would and should.

Similarly, may and might are from Old English mæg and meahte, respectively present and preterite forms of magan ("may, to be able"); shall and should are from sceal and sceolde, respectively present and preterite forms of sculan ("to owe, be obliged"); and will and would are from wille and wolde, respectively present and preterite forms of willan ("to wish, want").

The aforementioned Old English verbs cunnan, magan, sculan, and willan followed the preterite-present paradigm (or, in the case of willan, a similar but irregular paradigm), which explains the absence of the ending -s in the third person on the present forms can, may, shall, and will. (The original Old English forms given above were first and third person singular forms; their descendant forms became generalized to all persons and numbers.)

The verb must comes from Old English moste, part of the verb motan ("to be able to, be obliged to"). This was another preterite-present verb, of which moste was in fact the preterite (the present form mot gave rise to mote, which was used as a modal verb in Early Modern English; but must has now lost its past connotations and has replaced mote). Similarly, ought was originally a past form—it derives from ahte, preterite of agan ("to own"), another Old English preterite-present verb, whose present tense form ah has also given the modern (regular) verb owe (and ought was formerly used as a past tense of owe).

The verb dare also originates from a preterite-present verb, durran ("to dare"), specifically its present tense dear(r), although in its non-modal uses in Modern English it is conjugated regularly. However, need comes from the regular Old English verb neodian (meaning "to be necessary")—the alternative third person form need (in place of needs), which has become the norm in modal uses, became common in the 16th century.

Syntax
A modal verb serves as an auxiliary to another verb, which appears in the infinitive form (the bare infinitive, or the to-infinitive in the cases of ought and used as discussed above). Examples: You must escape; This may be difficult.

The verb governed by the modal may be another auxiliary (necessarily one that can appear in infinitive form—this includes be and have, but not another modal, except in the non-standard cases described below under ). Hence a modal may introduce a chain (technically catena) of verb forms, in which the other auxiliaries express properties such as aspect and voice, as in He must have been given a new job.

Modals can appear in tag questions and other elliptical sentences without the governed verb being expressed: ...can he?; I mustn't.; Would they?

Like other auxiliaries, modal verbs are negated by the addition of the word not after them. (The modification of meaning may not always correspond to simple negation, as in the case of must not.) The modal word can combine with not forms the single word cannot. Most of the modals have contracted negated forms in n't which are commonly used in informal English: can't, mustn't, won't (from will), etc.

Again like other auxiliaries, modal verbs undergo inversion with their subject, in forming questions and in the other cases described in the article on subject–auxiliary inversion: Could you do this?; On no account may you enter. When there is negation, the contraction with n't may undergo inversion as an auxiliary in its own right: Why can't I come in? (or: Why can I not come in?).

More information on these topics can be found at English clause syntax.

Past forms
The preterite (past) forms given above (could, might, should, and would, corresponding to can, may, shall, and will, respectively) do not always simply modify the meaning of the modal to give it past time reference. The only one regularly used as an ordinary past tense is could, when referring to ability: I could swim may serve as a past form of I can swim.

All the preterites are used as past equivalents for the corresponding present modals in indirect speech and similar clauses requiring the rules of sequence of tenses to be applied. For example, in 1960, it might have been said that People think that we will all be driving hovercars by the year 2000, whereas at a later date it might be reported that In 1960, people thought we would all be driving hovercars by the year 2000.

This "future-in-the-past" (also known as the past prospective, see: prospective) usage of would can also occur in independent sentences: I moved to Green Gables in 1930; I would live there for the next ten years.

In many cases, in order to give modals past reference, they are used together with a "perfect infinitive", namely the auxiliary have and a past participle, as in I should have asked her; You may have seen me.

Conditional sentences
The preterite forms of modals are used in counterfactual conditional sentences, in the apodosis (then-clause). The modal would (sometimes should as a first-person alternative) is used to produce the conditional construction which is typically used in clauses of this type: If you loved me, you would support me. It can be replaced by could (meaning "would be able to") and might (meaning "would possibly") as appropriate.

When the clause has past time reference, the construction with the modal plus perfect infinitive (see above) is used: If they (had) wanted to do it, they would (could/might) have done it by now. (The would have done construction is called the conditional perfect.)

The protasis (if-clause) of such a sentence typically contains the past tense of a verb (or the past perfect construction, in the case of past time reference), without any modal. The modal could may be used here in its role as the past tense of can (if I could speak French). However all the modal preterites can be used in such clauses with certain types of hypothetical future reference: if I should lose or should I lose (equivalent to if I lose); if you would/might/could stop doing that (usually used as a form of request).
 
Sentences with the verb wish (and expressions of wish using if only...) follow similar patterns to the if-clauses referred to above, when they have counterfactual present or past reference. When they express a desired event in the near future, the modal would is used: I wish you would visit me; If only he would give me a sign.

For more information see English conditional sentences and English subjunctive.

Replacements for defective forms
As noted above, English modal verbs are defective in that they do not have infinitive, participle, imperative, or (standard) subjunctive forms, and, in some cases, past forms. However in many cases there exist equivalent expressions that carry the same meaning as the modal, and can be used to supply the missing forms. In particular:
The modals can and could, in their meanings expressing ability, can be replaced by am/is/are able to and was/were able to. Additional forms can thus be supplied: the infinitive (to) be able to, the subjunctive and (rarely) imperative be able to, and the participles being able to and been able to.
The modals may and might, in their meanings expressing permission, can be replaced by am/is/are allowed to and was/were allowed to. 
The modal must in most meanings can be replaced by have/has to. This supplies the past and past participle form had to, and other forms (to) have to, having to.
Will can be replaced by am/is/are going to. This can supply the past and other forms: was/were going to, (to) be going to, being/been going to.
The modals should and ought to might be replaced by am/is/are supposed to, thus supplying the forms was/were supposed to, (to) be supposed to, being/been supposed to.

Contractions and reduced pronunciation
As already mentioned, most of the modals in combination with not form commonly used contractions: can't, won't, etc. Some of the modals also have contracted forms themselves:
 The verb will is often contracted to  'll; the same contraction may also represent shall.
 The verb would (or should, when used as a first-person equivalent of would) is often contracted to d.
 The had of had better is also often contracted to d. (The same contraction is also used for other cases of had as an auxiliary.)

Certain of the modals generally have a weak pronunciation when they are not stressed or otherwise prominent; for example, can is usually pronounced . Also ought to can become  "oughta". See weak and strong forms in English.

Usage of specific verbs

Can and could 

The modal verb can expresses possibility in a dynamic, deontic, or epistemic sense, that is, in terms of innate ability, permissibility, or possible circumstance. For example:
I can speak English means "I am able to speak English" or "I know how to speak English."
You can smoke here means "you may (are permitted to) smoke here" (in formal English may or might is sometimes considered more correct than can or could in these senses). 
There can be strong rivalry between siblings means that such rivalry is possible.

It is also used to express possible circumstance: We could be in trouble here. It is preferable to use could, may or might rather than can when expressing possible circumstance in a particular situation (as opposed to the general case, as in the "rivalry" example above, where can or may is used).

Both can and could can be used to make requests: Can/could you pass me the cheese? means "Please pass me the cheese" (where could indicates greater politeness).

It is common to use can with verbs of perception such as see, hear, etc., as in I can see a tree. Aspectual distinctions can be made, such as I could see it (ongoing state) vs. I saw it (event). See can see.

The use of could with the perfect infinitive expresses past ability or possibility, either in some counterfactual circumstance (I could have told him if I had seen him), or in some real circumstance where the act in question was not in fact realized: I could have told him yesterday (but in fact I didn't). The use of can with the perfect infinitive, can have..., is a rarer alternative to may have... (for the negative see below).

The negation of can is the single word cannot, only occasionally written separately as can not. Though cannot is preferred (as can not is potentially ambiguous), its irregularity (all other uncontracted verbal negations use at least two words) sometimes causes those unfamiliar with the nuances of English spelling to use the separated form. Its contracted form is can't (pronounced  in RP and some other dialects). The negation of could is the regular could not, contracted to couldn't.

The negative forms reverse the meaning of the modal (to express inability, impermissibility or impossibility). This differs from the case with may or might used to express possibility: it can't be true has a different meaning than it may not be true. Thus can't (or cannot) is often used to express disbelief in the possibility of something, as must expresses belief in the certainty of something. When the circumstance in question refers to the past, the form with the perfect infinitive is used: he can't (cannot) have done it means "I believe it impossible that he did it" (compare he must have done it).

Occasionally not is applied to the infinitive rather than to the modal (stress would then be applied to make the meaning clear): I could not do that, but I'm going to do it anyway.

May and might
The verb may expresses possibility in either an epistemic or deontic sense, that is, in terms of possible circumstance or permissibility. For example:
The mouse may be dead means that it is possible that the mouse is dead.
You may leave the room means that the listener is permitted to leave the room.
In expressing possible circumstance, may can have future as well as present reference (he may arrive means that it is possible that he will arrive; I may go to the mall means that I am considering going to the mall).

The preterite form might is used as a synonym for may when expressing possible circumstance (as can could – see above). It is sometimes said that might and could express a greater degree of doubt than may.

May (or might) can also express irrelevance in spite of certain or likely truth: He may be taller than I am, but he is certainly not stronger could mean "While it is (or may be) true that he is taller than I am, that does not make a difference, as he is certainly not stronger."

May can indicate presently given permission for present or future actions: You may go now. Might used in this way is milder: You might go now if you feel like it. Similarly May I use your phone? is a request for permission (might would be more hesitant or polite).

A less common use of may is to express wishes, as in May you live long and happy or May the Force be with you (see also English subjunctive).

When used with the perfect infinitive, may have indicates uncertainty about a past circumstance, whereas might have can have that meaning, but it can also refer to possibilities that did not occur but could have in other circumstances (see also conditional sentences above).
 She may have eaten the cake (the speaker does not know whether she ate cake).
 She might have eaten cake (this means either the same as the above, or else means that she did not eat cake but that it was or would have been possible for her to eat cake).

Note that the above perfect forms refer to possibility, not permission (although the second sense of might have might sometimes imply permission).

The negated form of may is may not; this does not have a common contraction (mayn't is obsolete). The negation of might is might not; this is sometimes contracted to mightn't, mostly in tag questions and in other questions expressing doubt (Mightn't I come in if I took my boots off?).

The meaning of the negated form depends on the usage of the modal. When possibility is indicated, the negation effectively applies to the main verb rather than the modal: That may/might not be means "That may/might not-be," i.e. "That may fail to be true." But when permission is being expressed, the negation applies to the modal or entire verb phrase: You may not go now means "You are not permitted to go now" (except in rare, spoken cases where not and the main verb are both stressed to indicate that they go together: You may go or not go, whichever you wish).

Shall and should 

The verb shall is used in some varieties of English in place of will, indicating futurity when the subject is first person (I shall, we shall).

With second- and third-person subjects, shall indicates an order, command or prophecy: Cinderella, you shall go to the ball! It is often used in writing laws and specifications: Those convicted of violating this law shall be imprisoned for a term of not less than three years; The electronics assembly shall be able to operate within a normal temperature range.

Shall is sometimes used in questions (in the first person) to ask for advice or confirmation of a suggestion: Shall I read now?; What shall we wear?

Should is sometimes used as a first-person equivalent for would (in its conditional and "future-in-the-past" uses), in the same way that shall can replace will. Should is also used to form a replacement for the present subjunctive in some varieties of English, and also in some conditional sentences with hypothetical future reference – see English subjunctive and English conditional sentences.

Should is often used to describe an expected or recommended behavior or circumstance. It can be used to give advice or to describe normative behavior, though without such strong obligatory force as must or have to. Thus You should never lie describes a social or ethical norm. It can also express what will happen according to theory or expectations: This should work. In these uses it is equivalent to ought to.

Both shall and should can be used with the perfect infinitive (shall/should have (done)) in their role as first-person equivalents of will and would (thus to form future perfect or conditional perfect structures). Also shall have may express an order with perfect aspect (you shall have finished your duties by nine o'clock). When should is used in this way it usually expresses something which would have been expected, or normatively required, at some time in the past, but which did not in fact happen (or is not known to have happened): I should have done that yesterday ("it would have been expedient, or expected of me, to do that yesterday").

The formal negations are shall not and should not, contracted to shan't and shouldn't. The negation effectively applies to the main verb rather than the auxiliary: you should not do this implies not merely that there is no need to do this, but that there is a need not to do this. The logical negation of I should is I ought not to or I am not supposed to.

Will and would 
 Will as a tense marker is often used to express futurity (The next meeting will be held on Thursday). Since this is an expression of time rather than modality, constructions with will (or sometimes shall; see above and at shall and will) are often referred to as the future tense of English, and forms like will do, will be doing, will have done and will have been doing are often called the simple future, future progressive (or future continuous), future perfect, and future perfect progressive (continuous). With first-person subjects (I, we), in varieties where shall is used for simple expression of futurity, the use of will indicates particular willingness or determination. (Future events are also sometimes referred to using the present tense (see Uses of English verb forms), or using the going to construction.)
 Will can express habitual aspect; for example, he will make mistakes may mean that he frequently makes mistakes (here the word will is usually stressed somewhat, and often expresses annoyance).
Will also has these uses as a modal:
 It can express strong probability with present time reference, as in That will be John at the door.
 It can be used to give an indirect order, as in You will do it right now.

Modal uses of the preterite form would include:
 Would is used in some conditional sentences.
 Expression of politeness, as in I would like... (for "I want") and Would you (be so kind as to) do this? (for "Please do this").
As a tense marker would is used as
 Future of the past, as in I knew I would graduate two years later. This is a past form of future will as described above under . (It is sometimes replaced by should in the first person in the same way that will is replaced by shall.)

As an aspect marker, would is used for
 Expression of habitual aspect in past time, as in Back then, I would eat early and would walk to school.

Both will and would can be used with the perfect infinitive (will have, would have), either to form the future perfect and conditional perfect forms already referred to, or to express perfect aspect in their other meanings (e.g. there will have been an arrest order, expressing strong probability).

The negated forms are will not (often contracted to won't) and would not (often contracted to wouldn't). In the modal meanings of will the negation is effectively applied to the main verb phrase and not to the modality (e.g. when expressing an order, you will not do it expresses an order not to do it, rather than just the absence of an order to do it).

Must and have to 
The modal must expresses obligation or necessity: You must use this form; We must try to escape. It can also express a conclusion reached by indirect evidence (e.g. Sue must be at home).

An alternative to must is the expression have to or has to depending on the pronoun (in the present tense sometimes have got to), which is often more idiomatic in informal English when referring to obligation.

When used with the perfect infinitive (i.e. with have and the past participle), must has only an epistemic flavor: Sue must have left means that the speaker concludes that Sue has left. To express obligation or necessity in the past, had to or some other synonym must be used.
 
The formal negation of must is must not (contracted to mustn't). However the negation effectively applies to the main verb, not the modality: You must not do this means that you are required not to do this, not just that you are not required to do this. To express the lack of requirement or obligation, the negative of have to or need (see below) can be used: You don't have to do this; You needn't do this.

The above negative forms are not usually used in the sense of a factual conclusion; here it is common to use can't to express confidence that something is not the case (as in It can't be here or, with the perfect, Sue can't have left).

Mustn't can nonetheless be used as a simple negative of must in tag questions and other questions expressing doubt: We must do it, mustn't we? Mustn't he be in the operating room by this stage?

Ought to and had better 
Ought is used with meanings similar to those of should expressing expectation or requirement. The principal grammatical difference is that ought is used with the to-infinitive rather than the bare infinitive, hence we should go is equivalent to we ought to go. Because of this difference of syntax, ought is sometimes excluded from the class of modal verbs, or is classed as a semi-modal.

Ought can be used with perfect infinitives in the same way as should (but again with the insertion of to): you ought to have done that earlier.

The grammatically negated form is ought not or oughtn't, equivalent in meaning to shouldn't (but again used with to). 

The expression had better has similar meaning to should and ought when expressing recommended or expedient behavior: I had better get down to work (it can also be used to give instructions with the implication of a threat: you had better give me the money or else). The had of this expression is similar to a modal: it governs the bare infinitive, it is defective in that it is not replaceable by any other form of the verb have, and it behaves syntactically as an auxiliary verb. For this reason the expression had better, considered as a kind of compound verb, is sometimes classed along with the modals or as a semi-modal.

The had of had better can be contracted to  'd, or in some informal usage (especially American) can be omitted. The expression can be used with a perfect infinitive: you'd better have finished that report by tomorrow. There is a negative form hadn't better, used mainly in questions: Hadn't we better start now? It is more common for the infinitive to be negated by means of not after better: You'd better not do that (meaning that you are strongly advised not to do that).

Dare and need 
The verbs dare and need can be used both as modals and as ordinary conjugated (non-modal) verbs. As non-modal verbs they can take a to-infinitive as their complement (I dared to answer her; He needs to clean that), although dare may also take a bare infinitive (He didn't dare go). In their uses as modals they govern a bare infinitive, and are usually restricted to questions and negative sentences.

Examples of the modal use of dare, followed by equivalents using non-modal dare, where appropriate:
Dare he do it? ("Does he dare to do it?")
I daren't (or dare not or dosn't) try. ("I don't dare to try")
How dare you! (idiomatic expression of outrage)
I dare say. (another idiomatic expression, here exceptionally without negation or question syntax)

The modal use of need is close in meaning to must expressing necessity or obligation. The negated form need not (needn't) differs in meaning from must not, however; it expresses lack of necessity, whereas must not expresses prohibition. Examples:
Need I continue? ("Do I need to continue? Must I continue?")
You needn't water the grass ("You don't have to water the grass"; compare the different meaning of You mustn't water...)

Modal need can also be used with the perfect infinitive: Need I have done that? It is most commonly used here in the negative, to denote that something that was done was (from the present perspective) not in fact necessary: You needn't have left that tip.

Used to

The verbal expression used to expresses past states or past habitual actions, usually with the implication that they are no longer so. It is followed by the infinitive (that is, the full expression consists of the verb used plus the to-infinitive). Thus the statement I used to go to college means that the speaker formerly habitually went to college, and normally implies that this is no longer the case.

While used to does not express modality, it has some similarities with modal auxiliaries in that it is invariant and defective in form and can follow auxiliary-verb syntax: it is possible to form questions like Used he to come here? and negatives like He used not (rarely usedn't) to come here. More common, however, (though not the most formal style) is the syntax that treats used as a past tense of an ordinary verb, and forms questions and negatives using did: Did he use(d) to come here? He didn't use(d) to come here.

Note the difference in pronunciation between the ordinary verb use  and its past form used  (as in scissors are used to cut paper), and the verb forms described here: .

The verbal use of used to should not be confused with the adjectival use of the same expression, meaning "familiar with", as in I am used to this, we must get used to the cold. When the adjectival form is followed by a verb, the gerund is used: I am used to going to college in the mornings.

Deduction 

In English, modal verbs as must, have to, have got to, can't and couldn't are used to express deduction and contention. These modal verbs state how sure the speaker is about something.

You're shivering—you must be cold.    
Someone must have taken the key: it is not here.
I didn't order ten books. This has to be a mistake. 
These aren't mine—they've got to be yours.
 It can't be a burglar. All the doors and windows are locked.

Double modals

In formal standard English usage, since modals are followed by a base verb, which modals are not, modal verbs cannot be used consecutively. That requirement then dictates they can be followed by only non-modal verbs. Might have to is acceptable ("have to" is not a modal verb), but *might must is not, even though must and have to can normally be used interchangeably. Two rules from different grammatical models supposedly disallow the construction. Proponents of Phrase structure grammar see the surface clause as allowing only one modal verb, while main verb analysis would dictate that modal verbs occur in finite forms.

A greater variety of double modals appears in some regional dialects. In English, for example, phrases such as would dare to and should have to are sometimes used in conversation and are grammatically correct. The double modal may sometimes be in the future tense, as in We must be able to work with must being the main auxiliary and be able to as the infinitive. Other examples include You may not dare to run or I would need to have help.

To put double modals in past tense, only the first modal is changed as in I could ought to. Double modals are also referred to as multiple modals.

To form questions, the subject and the first verb are swapped if the verb requires no do-support, such as Will you be able to write? If the main auxiliary requires do-support, the appropriate form of to do is added to the beginning, as in Did he use to need to fight? If modals are put in the perfect tense, the past participle of the infinitive is used, as in He had been going to swim or You have not been able to skate. In questions, the main verb and subject are swapped, as in Has she had to come?  

"I might could do something," for instance, is an example of a double modal construction that can be found in varieties of Southern American and Midland American English.

Comparison with other Germanic languages
Many English modals have cognates in other Germanic languages, albeit with different meanings in some cases. Unlike the English modals, however, these verbs are not generally defective; they can inflect, and have forms such as infinitives, participles and future tenses (for example using the auxiliary  in German). Examples of such cognates include:
 In German: ; cognates of may, must, can, shall, and will. Although German shares five modal verbs with English, their meanings are often quite different.  does not mean "to be allowed" but "may" as epistemic modal and "to like" as a normal verb followed by a noun. In English, "to have to" behaves the same way, whereas English "must" expresses an interdiction when negated. (need) is sometimes used like a modal verb, especially negated ( "He need not come.").
 In Dutch: ; cognates of may, must, can, shall, and will.
 In Danish: , cognates of may/must, can, will, shall.
 In Swedish: , cognates of may/might, must, can, will, shall.

Since modal verbs in other Germanic languages are not defective, the problem of double modals (see above) does not arise: the second modal verb in such a construction simply takes the infinitive form, as would any non-modal verb in the same position. Compare the following translations of English "I want to be able to dance", all of which translate literally as "I want can dance" (except German, which translates as "I want dance can"):

See also

Notes

References

External links

 Verbs in English Grammar, wikibook
 modal auxiliaries Website/Project that collects phrases containing modal auxiliaries on the web (in German and English)
 modal auxiliaries Website/Project that collects phrases containing modal auxiliaries on the web (in German and English)
 Modal auxiliary verbs: special points

English modal and auxiliary verbs